The 2017 Bretagne Classic Ouest–France was a road cycling one-day race that took place on 27 August. It was the 81st edition of the former GP Ouest–France race now known as the Bretagne Classic; it was also the 32nd event of the 2017 UCI World Tour. It was won by Elia Viviani in the sprint.

Result

References

External links
 

2017 UCI World Tour
2017 in French sport
2017
August 2017 sports events in Europe